SLV may refer to:

 IATA code for Shimla Airport, India
 ISO 3166 code for El Salvador
 ISO 639-2 code for Slovene language
 National Rail station code for Silver Street railway station, London, England
 Satellite Launch Vehicle, an Indian space launcher
 Civil Aviation Administration Denmark (Statens Luftfartsvæsen)
 NYSE symbol for iShares Silver Trust; see Commodity market
 State Library Victoria, the central library of Victoria